Palasi is a block and a notified area in Araria district in the Indian state of Bihar.
This block is 28 km away from Araria (the district headquarters) and lies north-east direction. Most of the people are poor and educationally weak. There are 21 panchayat and 104 villages. This block is higher educational person.  Their source of income are mainly agriculture. The population residing here is mainly Hindu and Muslim. The cause of the poverty is illiteracy and the recurrent floods in this area by Koshi and Bakra rivers. Palasi is now developing, and all the minimum needs of the people are fulfilled at Palasi block. Sukhsaina panchayat is the border of jokihat block balwa village are divided in three panchayat he is the clean village  There is also a Primary Health Center that provides health services to a limited extent. As such, for serious ailments, people have to go to places like Purnia, Araria and Kishanganj.

References

Cities and towns in Araria district